NCT (an acronym for Neo Culture Technology) is a South Korean boy band formed by SM Entertainment and introduced in January 2016. The group consists of 23 members and divided into four different sub-units: NCT U, NCT 127, NCT Dream, and WayV. In South Korean charts, NCT has recorded more than 27 million album sales across all sub-units, making them the best-selling act under SM Entertainment.

The group debuted their first sub-unit, the rotational NCT U, on April 9, 2016, with the double digital single "The 7th Sense" and "Without You". It was followed by the Seoul-based sub-unit NCT 127 on July 7, 2016, with their eponymous extended play and the then-teenaged sub-unit NCT Dream on August 24, 2016, with the digital single "Chewing Gum". WayV, a seven-member sub-unit based in China and NCT's first overseas sub-unit, debuted on January 17, 2019, with the single album The Vision. NCT's next overseas unit, currently known as NCT Tokyo, is set to debut in the third quarter of 2023 as their final subunit.

Although each sub-unit promotes separately, NCT has united three times as a group to record three full-length albums: Empathy (2018), Resonance (2020), and Universe (2021). Within two months of release, Resonance sold over 2.6 million copies across its two parts, becoming the highest-selling physical album released by an act from SM Entertainment at the time and earning the group their first Daesang (Grand Prize) Award at the 2020 Asia Artist Awards. Universe, which was released in December 2021, became their most pre-order album at 1.7 million copies, and later surpassed 1.8 million sales after its release.

Background and name 
In January 2016, SM Entertainment founder Lee Soo-man delivered a presentation at the SM Coex Artium titled "SMTOWN: New Culture Technology 2016". The label planned to debut a new boy group that would "fall in line" with their culture contents strategy, one that would contain an "unlimited" number of members that would debut in separate sub-units within the group. Furthermore, the members would form "sub-unit teams" and have "collaborations" with each other. The name of the group was later revealed to be NCT, an acronym for the presentation title. NCT as a whole was SM Entertainment's first idol group to debut in nearly two years since Red Velvet in 2014 and SM Entertainment's first boy group to debut since Exo in 2012.

History

2013–2016: Formation and pre-debut activities 

Prior to joining SM Entertainment, some of the members were already involved in the entertainment industry. Jeno appeared in various commercials as a child. Jisung was a child actor and filmed movies such as Boys, Be Curious (2012) and Go, Stop, Murder (2013). Chenle was active on the Chinese music scene as a singer from 2009 to 2015; he released three albums and headlined a concert in China. In 2011, Yuta participated in the singing competition "Juice Winter Collection" in Japan, while Ten competed on the Thai TV show Teen Superstar under the name TNT. Xiaojun was a singing contestant on the Zhejiang TV program X-Fire in November 2015.

Johnny, Yuta, Ten, Mark and Renjun joined the company via SM Global Auditions, while the remaining members were discovered through street casting, personal recommendation, community entertainment shows, and local auditions. Prior to their debut as members of NCT, 19 of the 23 current members of NCT were introduced as part of SM Rookies, a group of trainees under SM Entertainment created in December 2013. The first members of NCT to be introduced were Taeyong and Jeno. Sixteen other members were introduced through SM Rookies until early January 2016.

Taeyong released the short rap track "Open the Door" in July 2014 and featured on Red Velvet's second single "Be Natural" in October of the same year. He appeared alongside Johnny, Yuta, Ten, Jaehyun, Mark, Jeno, Haechan, Jaemin and Jisung on the Mnet-produced Exo 90:2014, a show starring labelmates Exo, where they performed dances to K-pop songs from the 1990s. Some members appeared in various Exo music video remakes in the same year. From January through June 2015, Doyoung and Jaehyun were the hosts of the music show Show Champion; from July through December of that year, Yuta was a Japanese representative on Abnormal Summit, a series in which non-Korean men debate Korean culture. Mark, Jeno, Haechan, Jaemin and Jisung were Mouseketeers on Disney Channel Korea's The Mickey Mouse Club. SM Rookies Boys held their first concert, titled SM Rookies Show, which started in Seoul in September 2015 and expanded to Bangkok, Thailand in February 2016. Taeil released his first solo soundtrack "Because Of You" for the series The Merchant: Gaekju 2015 on January 26, 2016. In April 2016, Kun sang with NCT U on the Chinese version of "Without You" and joined them for the song's promotional stages. Winwin performed NCT U's "The 7th Sense" at their first live performance in China at the 16th Music Feng Yun Bang Awards that same month. In October 2016, Johnny participated in the music festival "Spectrum Dance Music Festival" as an SM Dreamstation Crew DJ.

SM Entertainment founder Lee Soo-man held a presentation at the SM Coex Artium titled "SM Town: Neo Culture Technology 2016" on January 28, 2016, where he outlined the company's plans for a new boy group in line with their "culture contents" strategy that would debut different teams based in different cities and countries around the world.

2016–2018: Debut of NCT U, NCT 127 and NCT Dream and first collaborative project

On April 4, 2016, SM Entertainment announced NCT's first sub-unit would be NCT U, meaning "NCT United", which then consisted of six members: Taeil, Taeyong, Doyoung, Ten, Jaehyun and Mark. NCT U released the digital singles "The 7th Sense" on April 9 and "Without You" in two versions on April 10 (a Korean version sung by Taeil, Doyoung, and Jaehyun and a Chinese version with the addition of SM Rookies' Kun). On April 9, NCT U made their first broadcast appearance with NCT On Air on V Live hosted by Super Junior's Kim Hee-chul. The same day, they had their first live performance in China at the 16th Music Feng Yun Bang Awards alongside Chinese rookies Kun and Winwin. On April 15, the group made their debut in Korea on Music Bank.

On July 1, SM announced NCT's second sub-unit, NCT 127. The unit would be based in Seoul, the number "127" representing the longitude coordinate of the city. The unit debuted with seven members: Taeil, Taeyong, Yuta, Jaehyun, Winwin, Mark, and Haechan. On July 7, they had their official debut performance on the music program M Countdown, performing debut single "Fire Truck" and "Once Again." Their debut EP, NCT #127, was released digitally on July 10 and physically on July 11. On August 18, SM announced that NCT's third sub-unit would be NCT Dream. The unit debuted with seven members: Mark, Renjun, Jeno, Haechan, Jaemin, Chenle and Jisung. Their first single, "Chewing Gum", was released on August 24, and the group had their debut performance on M Countdown the next day.

On December 27, 2016, NCT 127 announced they would be making a comeback with two new members, Johnny and NCT U's Doyoung. On March 8, NCT 127 members Johnny and Jaehyun were announced as the DJs for SBS Power FM's new program, NCT's Night Night, which began airing on March 20. In January 2018, Taeil, Doyoung, and Jaehyun released the single "Timeless" under NCT U as part of the SM Station project.

Later that moth, SM Entertainment unveiled NCT 2018, a project involving all 18 members of NCT at the time. On January 30, SM released a video titled "NCT 2018 Yearbook #1", which featured all prior members and introduced new members Kun, Lucas, and Jungwoo. In February, NCT released a series of online documentary videos titled NCTmentary as part of the NCT 2018 project. NCT released their first full-length album, NCT 2018 Empathy, on March 14. The album featured six singles, showcasing each sub-unit of NCT: "Boss", "Baby Don't Stop", and "Yestoday" by various NCT U lineups; "Go" by NCT Dream; "Touch" by NCT 127; and "Black on Black" with all 18 members. NCT topped Billboard Emerging Artists chart on May 5, marking the first time that a K-pop act had led the list. 

Mark graduated from NCT Dream after the release of their second EP, We Go Up, in September. On September 11, Xiaojun was the first of the then-undebuted WayV members to be introduced through SM Rookies, with Hendery and Yangyang following on September 13 and September 15, respectively. Jungwoo was added to NCT 127 in October, with the release of their first studio album, Regular-Irregular. Winwin did not participate in promotional activities of the album's reissue, Regulate, in order to prepare for his debut with WayV.

2019–2020: Debut of WayV, NCT Dream restructure and NCT 2020 Resonance

On December 31, 2018, SM Entertainment announced NCT's fourth sub-unit, WayV under Label V. The unit would be based in China and consists of seven members: Kun, Winwin, Ten, Lucas, Hendery, Xiaojun and Yangyang. The sub-unit officially debuted on January 17, 2019, with a Chinese version of NCT 127's "Regular". Their debut single album, The Vision, was released digitally and included a Chinese version of NCT 127's "Come Back" and an original song titled "Dream Launch". On December 13, NCT U (consisting of Taeil, Doyoung, Jaehyun and Haechan) released "Coming Home" as part of the SM Station X project. After wrapping up album promotions for their EP Reload in April, NCT Dream abandoned their original concept in which members "graduate" from the sub-unit upon reaching age of majority (20 in Korean age reckoning, 19 internationally) and continued as seven members, with Mark returning to the lineup.

In September, NCT announced a reunion for a second group project, NCT 2020, in October 2020. The first part of their second album, NCT 2020 Resonance Pt. 1, was released on October 12. The record featured all four existing units and two new members, Shotaro and Sungchan, who are set to debut with a future NCT unit. NCT 2020 Resonance Pt. 1 garnered more than 1.1 million stock pre-orders ahead of release, making it NCT's first million-selling album without repackaging. NCT released NCT 2020 Resonance Pt. 2 on November 23. On December 4, NCT released the single "Resonance" as the finale of their second group studio album. The single combines the tracks "Make a Wish (Birthday Song)", "90's Love", "Work It", and "Raise the Roof" from their second studio album and features all 23 members. They held their first concert as a full group, titled NCT: Resonance "Global Wave", on December 27 through Beyond Live, which attracted more than 200,000 viewers.

2021–present: Universe, new sub-units, and end of global expansion
On November 13, NCT announced their third group project, NCT 2021, with their third studio album Universe set for release on December 14. The 13-track album included the lead singles "Universe (Let's Play Ball)", which was released on December 10, and "Beautiful". Universe surpassed more than 1.7 million pre-orders on the day of release, breaking their previous record of 1.1 million pre-orders for NCT 2020 Resonance.

On February 3, 2023, SM Entertainment announced their producing strategy for 2023, where it was revealed that the group's next unit, NCT Tokyo, will be debuting in the third quarter of 2023. On February 24, SM revealed their plans for the first half of 2023, where they announced that following NCT Tokyo's debut, the group's concept of international expansion would come to an end, permanently fixing the group at five subunits. On March 9, 2023, it was announced that members Doyoung, Jaehyun, and Jungwoo will be debuting in a new fixed sub-unit, named Do Jae Jung. They are set to release an album in the first half of 2023.

Members

Adapted from the group's profile on SM Entertainment's official website.

Sub-units

Timeline

Black (vertical) - Studio albums (as a whole)
Red (vertical) - Studio albums (by NCT 127)
Purple (vertical) - Studio albums (by NCT Dream)
Orange (vertical) - Studio albums (by WayV)

Discography

 NCT 2018 Empathy (2018)
 NCT 2020 Resonance (2020)
 Universe (2021)

Concerts 

 NCT: Resonance "Global Wave" (2020)

Filmography

NCT Life
NCT World 2.0
Welcome to NCT Universe

Awards and nominations

Notes

References

External links
 
  (2020 archive)
 
 
 

NCT (band)
South Korean boy bands
SM Town
SM Entertainment artists
Avex Trax artists
2016 establishments in South Korea
South Korean hip hop groups
South Korean male dancers
South Korean dance music groups
Mandarin-language singers of South Korea
English-language singers from South Korea
Musical groups established in 2016
K-pop music groups